Brayford is a village and civil parish in Devon, England, situated about  from South Molton and  from Barnstaple.  It lies on Exmoor and sits beneath open areas of common land. It is a small rural community and in the surrounding area are many farms.

Brayford is around 1 mile from the hamlet of Charles and is also host to several quarries.  The village can be found along the Ilfracombe - South Molton Road in North Devon, and is also near to the North Devon Link Road which connects the area with the M5.

The large Brayford Quarry lies on the outskirts of the village. It is operated by Hansons but remains an asset of Archibald Nott & Sons.

External links
 Brayford website

Villages in Devon